Intraflagellar transport protein 20 homolog is a protein that in humans is encoded by the IFT20 gene. The gene is composed of 6 exons and is
located on human chromosome 17p11.1. This gene is expressed in human brain, lung, kidney and pancreas, and lower expression were also detected in human placenta, liver, thymus, prostate and testis.

Intraflagellar transport (IFT), in which molecular motors and IFT particle proteins participate, is very important in assembling and maintaining many cilia/flagella, such as the motile cilia that drive the swimming of cells and embryos, the nodal cilia that generate left-right asymmetry in vertebrate embryos, and the sensory cilia that detect sensory stimuli in some animals. IFT20 subunit of the particle is localized to the Golgi complex in addition to the basal body and cilia where all previous IFT particle proteins had been found. In living cells, fluorescently tagged IFT20 is highly dynamic and moves between the Golgi complex and the cilium as well as along ciliary microtubules. IFT20 has been shown to interact with SPEF2 in the testis, and plays a role in sperm motility.

References

Further reading